"All My Best Friends Are Metalheads" is a single by the American ska punk band Less Than Jake. The two live tracks on the single are taken from a 7" track that the band did in 2000.

It was released to airplay on July 4, 2000 although the album itself was recorded and released in 1998. It is one of the group's best known songs.

There are two versions of the intro to this song. In most cases, it starts with a clip from a Victor Lundberg speech called “An Open Letter to My Teenage Son.” The other is a clip from the documentary Heavy Metal Parking Lot.

In the UK Singles Chart, it got to number 51.

A metalhead is a fan of heavy metal music.

Track listing
"All My Best Friends Are Metalheads (Radio Edit)" – 3:27
"Help Save The Youth Of America From Exploding (Live)" – 3:23
"Rock-N-Roll Pizzeria (Live)" – 2:14

In popular culture
It is featured in the video games Street Sk8er and Tony Hawk's Pro Skater 4, and in the soundtrack for the 2000 film Digimon: The Movie. The song was also used in a demo reel of Craig Yoe's Yoe! Studio in the early 2000s.

Personnel
 Chris DeMakes - guitar
 Roger Manganelli - bass guitar, lead vocals
 Vinnie Fiorello - drums, lyrics
 Buddy Schaub - trombone
 Derron Nuhfer - saxophone
 Pete Anna- trombone

References

2000 singles
Less Than Jake songs
1998 songs
Song recordings produced by Howard Benson
Capitol Records singles
Songs about friendship
Songs about youth subcultures